Opuntia dulcis has been described as a variety of, and is confused with, O. phaeacantha. However, O. dulcis is a larger plant with ascending branches, to 2 ft (exceptionally 4 ft). While it is a larger plant, immature specimens of O. dulcis may overlap in size with O. phaeacantha.

Details
Opuntia dulcis resembles O. engelmannii in some ways but does not become as erect or large as that species. Also, the spines of O. dulcis are finer than those of O. engelmannii. O. dulcis is found across the deserts of the southwestern United States and northern Mexico. It is common in trans-Pecos Texas, New Mexico, and Arizona. It has been observed in the mountains of southern Nevada..

References

External links
Opuntia dulcis photo gallery at Opuntia Web
Cacti of the Trans-Pecos and Adjacent Areas (see page 169)

dulcis